Robert Mehrabian is an Armenian-American materials scientist and the executive chairman of Teledyne Technologies Incorporated.  He assumed this position January 1, 2019. He was chairman, president and chief executive officer of the company from 2000 to December 31, 2018, and president and chief executive officer from 1999 to 2000. Mehrabian held various senior executive positions at Allegheny Teledyne Incorporated (ATI) starting in July 1997, prior to the spin-off of Teledyne Technologies Incorporated in November 1999.  Previously he was president of Carnegie Mellon University from 1990 to 1997.  He has served on the board of directors of several public companies, including Mellon Financial Corporation and its successor, Bank of New York Mellon Corporation (1994–2011) and PPG Industries, Inc. (1992–2014).

Mehrabian holds bachelor and Doctor of Science degrees from the Massachusetts Institute of Technology. His academic career spanned almost thirty years starting at MIT in 1968 and concluding as president of Carnegie Mellon University. He left MIT in 1975, where he was an associate professor. From 1975 to 1979, he was professor of metallurgy and professor of mechanical engineering at the University of Illinois in Champaign-Urbana. From 1983 to 1990, he served as dean of engineering at the University of California, Santa Barbara.

Mehrabian also spent four years in the Senior Executive Service of the U.S. Government. As director of the Center for Materials Science of the Department of Commerce's National Institute of Standards and Technology he initiated numerous government/industry programs that became models for such cooperative efforts. During his U.C. Santa Barbara and Carnegie Mellon University tenures, he spun-off a number of high technology companies. An internationally recognized authority on advanced technologies, Mehrabian also served as senior advisor in manufacturing and high technology processes to many Fortune 500 companies.

Mehrabian holds eight U.S. and more than 40 foreign patents. He has authored 139 technical papers and edited six books in the field of materials science and engineering. His awards include Fellow and distinguished Life Member of the American Society of Metals International (ASM), the Henry Marion Howe Medal of the ASM, and a Fellow and Leadership Award recipient of the Minerals, Metals and Materials Society (TMS). His honorary degrees include Sc.D. from Carnegie Mellon and L.H.D. from Chatham College. He was also elected a member of the National Academy of Engineering 1984 for significant and timely advances in the rapid solidification of alloy systems and in the novel casting of liquid-solid mixtures.

References

Presidents of Carnegie Mellon University
Living people
American people of Armenian descent
Massachusetts Institute of Technology alumni
University of Illinois Urbana-Champaign faculty
University of California, Santa Barbara faculty
Iranian people of Armenian descent
Phillips Exeter Academy alumni
PPG Industries people
Members of the United States National Academy of Engineering
Year of birth missing (living people)
Fellows of the Minerals, Metals & Materials Society